Calamodontophis is a genus of snakes in the family Colubridae. 
The genus is endemic to South America.

Geographic range
Species in the genus Calamodontophis are found in Brazil and Uruguay.

Species
The genus Calamodontophis contains the following species:
 Calamodontophis paucidens 
 Calamodontophis ronaldoi 

Nota bene: A binomial authority in parentheses indicates that the species was originally described in a genus other than Calamodontophis.

References

Further reading
Amaral A (1963). "Geochelone from the Pleistocene of Curaçao, Netherlands Antilles". Copeia 1963 (3): 579–580. (Calamodontophis, new genus, p. 580).

 
Snake genera
Taxonomy articles created by Polbot
Reptiles of Brazil
Reptiles of Uruguay